Minbash-e Hesarlu (also Romanized as Mīnbāsh-e Ḩeşārlū; also known as Mīnbāsh Ḩeşārī) is a village in Quri Chay-ye Gharbi Rural District, Saraju District, Maragheh County, East Azerbaijan Province, Iran. At the 2006 census, its population was 79, in 19 families.

References 

Towns and villages in Maragheh County